Antonio Faccilongo (born 1979) is an Italian documentary photographer, filmmaker, and educator. He is a professor of photography at Rome University of Fine Arts. Faccilongo won the World Press Photo Story of the Year in 2021.

Career 
Faccilongo started his career as news photographer at Il Messaggero, an Italian newspaper based in Rome. In 2008, he began to deal with stories of international interest and focused his attention on Asia and the Middle East, principally in Israel and Palestine, covering social, political and cultural issues.

Faccilongo developed his long-term photography series Habibi to cover the complicated contemporary conflicts of the Israeli–Palestinian conflict. According to Firstpost, the series "chronicles love stories set against the backdrop of one of the longest contemporary conflicts, the Israeli-Palestinian war. The story shows the impact of the conflict on Palestinian families and the difficulties they face in preserving their reproductive rights and human dignity." The Guardian writes, "Items left behind by inmates allow us to perceive the absence of men and to understand the emptiness they left in the life of their family members."

Habibi won both the World Press Photo Story of the Year from the World Press Photo Foundation and first prize in Long-term projects category. The work was mentioned in Verve magazine and published as a story at Vice. Habibi was selected to be published as a book by an international jury. The book is edited by Sarah Leen, designed by Ramon Pez and includes the poetry of Taha Muhammad Ali.

In 2016, for Vice he documented the illegal narcotics trade in Gaza, writing that his work "imposes a socio-anthropological lens to explore escapism and suffering in the face of social malaise."

Faccilongo's other long-term projects include Lose The Roots, and All For Love. His stories include "Atomic Rooms", "Fade Away", "Kaitseliit", "(Single) Women", "Wuchale", "Huaxi", and "I am Legend".

Publications

Films 
 Digital Heroin – documentary
 My Brother is an Only Child – documentary
 The Chinese Dream – documentary
 Kaitseliit – documentary

Awards 

 2011: 2nd prize, International Photography Awards in Political Category
 2011: 1st prize, World Of Women
 2011: 1st prize, Kuala Lumpur International PhotoAwards
 2011: 1st prize, International Photography Awards in People  	
 2011: 1st prize, Worldwide Photography Gala Awards
 2011: 1st prize, Px3 in Feature Category
 2015: Finalist, LensCulture Visual Storytelling Awards 	
 2015: 1st prize, MIFA in Sport category
 2016: Finalist, Fotoleggendo Premio Tabò
 2016: Finalist, LensCulture Portrait Awards
 2016: 3rd prize, Px3 in Feature Category 	
 2016: 1st award, Umbria World Fest
 2016: 1st award, LuganoPhotoDays
 2016: Best Color Documentary work Gomma Grant
 2017: Finalist, LensCulture Magnum Awards
 2017: 2nd prize, PHMuseum Grant
 2017: Getty Editorial Grant winner
 2019: Winner, Pictures of the Year International (POYi) in World Understand Award category
 2020: Winner, Photo District News in photojournalism category
 2020: Fotoevidence Book Award with World Press Photo winner
2020: FotoEvidence Book Award with World Press Photo for Habibi
 2021: World Press Photo Story of the Year from World Press Photo
 2021: 1st prize in Long-Term Projects category at World Press Photo
 2021: Feature Shoot winner
 2021 Shortlist, Sony World Photography Awards (Lose the Roots)
 2021: National Geographic Society's COVID-19 Emergency Fund

References 

Italian photographers
Italian filmmakers
1979 births
Living people
Documentary photographers